The Launceston Cup is a Tasmanian Turf Club Group 3 open handicap Thoroughbred horse race run over a distance of 2400 metres at Launceston Racecourse in Mowbray, Tasmania, Australia in February.  Prize money in the event is A$300,000.

History
The race is part of the Tasmanian Summer Racing Carnival, and is also one of Tasmania's main annual social events. The Cup was first run in 1865.

Distance
 1865–1873  -  3 miles  (~4800 metres)
 1874–1879  -  2 miles  (~3200 metres)
 1880–1891  -  1 miles (~2800 metres)
 1892–1968  -  1 miles (~2400 metres)
 1969–1973  -  1 miles (~2600 metres)
 1974–2001  -  2600 metres
 2002 onwards  -  2400 metres

Grade
 1875–1979 - Principal race
 1980 onwards - Group 3 race

Winners

 2023 - Aurora's Symphony
 2022 - Aurora's Symphony
 2021 - Glass Warrior
 2020 - Home By Midnight
 2019 - Eastender
 2018 - Bondeiger
 2017 - Big Duke
 2016 - Up Cups
 2015 - Genuine Lad
 2014 - Epingle
 2013 - Geegees Blackflash
 2012 - Prevailing
 2011 - Fast Future
 2010 - Larrys Never Late
 2009 - Zavite
 2008 - Ista Kareem
 2007 - Hofmeister
 2006 - Precise Timing
 2005 - Dakasha
 2004 - Zacielo
 2003 - St. Andrews
 2002 - St. Andrews
 2001 - Full Of Rhythm
 2000 - St. Andrews
 1999 - Streak
 1998 - King's Landing
 1997 - Ticking Away
 1996 - Free Beer
 1995 - Free Beer
 1994 - Rich Dreams
 1993 - Diamond Bases
 1992 - Star Cheers
 1991 - Bitter Spring
 1990 - Down The Pitch
 1989 - Shykoski
 1988 - Superior Way
 1987 - Brave Trespasser
 1986 - Epigram
 1985 - Scruples
 1984 - Martian's Son
 1983 - Nifty Red
 1982 - Andrias
 1981 - Anzaas
 1980 - Summer
 1979 - Jessephenie
 1978 - Recollect
 1977 - Brallos
 1976 - Brallos
 1975 - King Boongarie
 1974 - Trader
 1973 - Woodfield
 1972 - Shipwright
 1971 - Neamoc
 1970 - Red Tornado
 1969 - Rainbow Isle
 1968 - Limit
 1967 - San Sebastian
 1966 - Nicotera
 1965 - Marco's Folly
 1964 - Mayno
 1963 - Juraco
 1962 - Native Land
 1961 - Sweet Maine
 1960 - Overproof
 1959 - Wing Shades
 1958 - Tavua
 1957 - Lord Carrick
 1956 - Dongarra
 1955 - Vamos
 1954 - Vamos
 1953 - Lord Burleigh
 1952 - English
 1951 - Dick Turpin
 1950 - Tarcombe
 1949 - The Artist
 1948 - Manakau
 1947 - Miss Dart
 1946 - Gamelin
 1945 - Hero
 1944 - Son O'Val
 1943 - Entitle
 1942 - Jane Moorhead
 1941 - Old Days
 1940 - Beau Roi
 1939 - Keeping Watch
 1938 - Radiant Boy
 1937 - Royal Barb
 1936 - Coolart
 1935 - Gabbler
 1934 - Baanya
 1933 - Motive
 1932 - Finsbury
 1931 - Darpuna
 1930 - Tarapunga
 1929 - Laird O'Cockpen
 1928 - Lycurgides
 1927 - Head Girl
 1926 - Spreadeagle
 1925 - Seignorina
 1924 - Amazonia
 1923 - Seignorina
 1922 - Royal Reserve
 1921 - Sand Dune
 1920 - Trusty Blade
 1919 - Ordella
 1918 - Ordella
 1917 - Bucklaw
 1916 - Rock Temple
 1915 - Hayston
 1914 - Hugli 
 1913 - Uncle Matt
 1912 - Desire
 1911 - Loyal Blue
 1910 - Iliad Drumreagh
 1909 - Golden Gate
 1908 - Regret
 1907 - Wathful
 1906 - Watchful
 1905 - Hatteras
 1904 - Southern Cross
 1903 - Chesterfield
 1902 - Cordon The Sirdar
 1901 - Royalty
 1900 - Eiridsdale
 1899 - Flintlock
 1898 - Sortie
 1897 - Mountaineer
 1896 - Caller Ou
 1895 - Golden King
 1894 - Amadeus
 1893 - Comedian
 1892 - Retreat
 1891 - Dundas
 1890 - Macquarie
 1889 - Chaldean
 1888 - Ruby
 1887 - The Knave
 1886 - Duration
 1885 - Hobart
 1884 - Sheet Anchor
 1883 - Rhesus
 1882 - Stockwell
 1881 - race not held
 1880 - Swiveller
 1879 - Swiveller
 1878 - Aldinga
 1877 - Spark
 1876 - Strop
 1875 - Ella
 1874 - Strop
 1873 - Leo
 1872 - Misty Morn
 1871 - Romula
 1870 - race not held
 1869 - Strop
 1868 - Fireworks
 1867 - Fishhook
 1866 - Strop
 1865 - Panic

See also
 List of Australian Group races
 Group races

References

External links
Summer Racing Carnival
Tasmanian racing industry restructure

Horse races in Australia
Sport in Launceston, Tasmania